Madia is the surname of the following notable people:
Chunilal Madia (1922–1968), Gujarati author from India
Giorgio Madia (born 1965), Italian opera and ballet choreographer and stage director 
Kanti Madia, Indian actor, director, producer and playwright 
Marianna Madia (born 1980), Italian politician
Stefano Madia (1954–2004), Italian film actor
William Madia (born 1947), American scientist

Italian-language surnames